Aishath Nahula (sometimes known by Aisha; born 12 March 1982) is a Maldivian politician and public figure. She is currently the Minister of Transport and Civil Aviation of Maldives, and a national council member of the Jumhooree Party.

Career
Aisha was elected to the national executive council of the Jumhooree Party in June 2018.

During the 2018 presidential elections, Aisha traveled to several islands on campaign to garner support for MDP/joint opposition presidential candidate Ibrahim Mohamed Solih who won the bitterly fought elections which were held on 23 September 2018.

Personal life
At the age of 18, she married prominent businessman and leader of the Jumhooree Party of Maldives, Qasim Ibrahim and has 6 children from him.

She owns a resort called sun island resort with she got from her husband as mahr

References

External links

Female foreign ministers
Maldivian women diplomats
Maldivian politicians
Living people
21st-century Maldivian women politicians
21st-century Maldivian politicians
1982 births